Ahmad Shah's Tomb, locally known as Badshah no Hajiro or Raja no Hajiro (King's Mausoleum), is a medieval mosque and the group of tombs in Ahmedabad, India. Ahmad Shah's tomb is situated close to Jama Mosque and Manek Chowk.

History

The mosque has the tomb of Ahmad Shah I, the founder of Ahmedabad in centre. It was completed by his son Muhammad Shah II (r. 1442-1451) who is buried to his left. His grandson Qutb-ud-Din Ahmad Shah II (1451–1458) is buried to his right. The tomb of Ahmad Shah's brother is outside of the main chamber. On Ahmad Shah's tomb flowers and chadars are still offered.

Architecture
The mosque has the main square building with large central dome. There are four chambers at all four corners with smaller domes. The tombs are in centre. The chamber is lit with delicately carved stone screens, (jaalis).

Women are not allowed to enter, and men must cover their heads before entering. There are also tombs of a few ministers laid across the road.

Naubat
Naubat is a traditional orchestra which announced arrival and departure of the king, welcomed dignitaries, marked beginning of wars and special occasions like birth, death or marriage of Royals. They were also time keepers of the city. Naubat is still played as a remembrance of Ahmad Shah near the tomb. The ninth generation of Naubat musicians plays nagara and shehnai every day at Naubat Khana, a drum room above the entrance of the tomb. They played  Naubat at evening to announce the sunset and at night to announce the closing of the gates of fort during royal times. They are played at 19:30 (or sunset) and 23:00 IST every day. On Thursday and Friday three more Naubats are played; 09:00, 12:00 and 15:00 IST.

Gallery

See also

 Rani no Hajiro

References 

Tombs in Ahmedabad
Mausoleums in Gujarat
Monuments of National Importance in Gujarat